Imlili (also transliterated "Imililik") is a town in the disputed territory of Western Sahara. It is administered by Morocco as a rural commune in Oued Ed-Dahab Province in the region of Dakhla-Oued Ed-Dahab. In the maps of the early years of the 20th century, it was known as El-Fadj or El-Fuj. At the time of the 2004 census, the commune had a total population of 2311 people living in 474 households.

References

Populated places in Oued Ed-Dahab Province
Rural communes of Dakhla-Oued Ed-Dahab